An executioner, also known as a hangman or headsman, is an official who executes a sentence of capital punishment on a legally condemned person.

Scope and job 
The executioner was usually presented with a warrant authorising or ordering him to execute the sentence. The warrant protects the executioner from the charge of murder. Common terms for executioners derived from forms of capital punishment—though they often also performed other physical punishments—include hangman (hanging) and headsman (beheading). In the military, the role of executioner was performed by a soldier, such as the provost. A common stereotype of an executioner is a hooded medieval or absolutist executioner. Symbolic or real, executioners were rarely hooded, and not robed in all black; hoods were only used if an executioner's identity and anonymity were to be preserved from the public. As Hilary Mantel noted in her 2018 Reith Lectures, "Why would an executioner wear a mask? Everybody knew who he was".

While this task can be occasional in nature, it can be carried out in the line of more general duty by an officer of the court, the police, prison staff, or even the military. A special case is the tradition of the Roman fustuarium, continued in forms of running the gauntlet, where the culprit receives their punishment from the hands of the comrades gravely harmed by their crime, e.g. for failing in vital sentinel duty or stealing from a ship's limited food supply.

Many executioners were professional specialists who traveled a circuit or region performing their duty, because executions were rarely very numerous. Within this region, a resident executioner would also administer non-lethal physical punishments, or apply torture. In medieval Europe, to the end of the early modern period, executioners were often knackers, since pay from the rare executions was not enough to live off.

In medieval Europe executioners also taxed lepers and prostitutes, and controlled gaming houses.  They were also in charge of the latrines and cesspools, and disposing of animal carcasses.

The term is extended to administrators of severe physical punishment that is not prescribed to kill, but which may result in death.

Executions in France (using the guillotine since the French Revolution) persisted until 1977, and the French Republic had an official executioner; the last one, Marcel Chevalier, served until the formal abolition of capital punishment in 1981.

In society 
In Western Europe and its colonies, executioners were often shunned by their neighbours, with their work as knackers also disreputable. In Alexandre Dumas' The Three Musketeers and in the film La veuve de Saint-Pierre (The Widow of Saint-Peter), minor character executioners are ostracized by the villagers.

The profession of executioner sometimes ran through a family, especially in France, where the Sanson family provided six executioners between 1688 and 1847 and the Deibler dynasty provided five between 1879 and its 1981 abolition. The latter's members included Louis Deibler, his son Anatole, Anatole's nephew Jules-Henri Desfourneaux, his other nephew André Obrecht, and André's nephew Marcel Chevalier.

In Britain, the most notable dynasty was the Pierrepoints, who provided three executioners between 1902 and 1956 – Henry, his brother Thomas, and Henry's son Albert. Unlike in France and many other European countries, far from being shunned, British executioners such as William Marwood, James Berry, Albert Pierrepoint, and Harry Allen were widely known and respected by the public.

In Japan, executioners have been held in contempt as part of the burakumin class (today executions in Japan are not carried out by professional executioners, but by prison guards). In Memories of Silk and Straw, by Junichi Saga, one of the families surveyed in the Japanese village of Tsuchiura is that of an executioner family ("The Last Executioner", p. 54). This family does suffer social isolation, even though the family is somewhat well-off financially.

In the Ottoman Empire, only Romani could be executioners. Executioners were seen as "damned" people and even their graveyards were separate from public graveyards. There were no inscriptions on executioner tombstones, and usually uncarved and unpolished simple rough stones were used. One of the oldest and largest "executioner graveyards" is in the Eyüp district in Istanbul. After the republican revolution in Turkey, executions continued to be performed by Romani executioners. This situation continued until the abolition of capital punishment in Turkey.

The town of Roscommon has the distinction of having had Ireland's most notorious hangwoman, Lady Betty, who was given the post in exchange for her life being spared when the hangman due to execute her death sentence took ill on the day that she and 25 others were due to be hanged. Lady Betty offered to carry out the task in exchange for her death sentence being commuted to a life sentence, and she acted as the county's hangwoman from then on.
An unidentified woman hanged two men for murder on 13 November 1782 at Kilmainham, near Dublin. The men were also quartered. The sheriff received abuse for making a hangman of a woman.

See also 
 List of executioners
 Scharfrichter
 Breaking wheel
 Executioner's sword
 Sword of justice
 Pierrepoint
 The Executioner

Gallery

References 

Capital punishment
 
Legal professions
Penology